Lathrop Township is an inactive township in Clinton County, in the U.S. state of Missouri.

Lathrop Township was established in 1867.

References

Townships in Missouri
Townships in Clinton County, Missouri